Mirosław Wojciech Maliszewski (born 28 February 1968 in Warsaw) is a Polish politician. He was elected to the Sejm on 25 September 2005, getting 6,954 votes in 17 Radom district as a candidate from the Polish People's Party list.

See also
Members of Polish Sejm 2005-2007

External links
Mirosław Maliszewski - parliamentary page - includes declarations of interest, voting record, and transcripts of speeches.

Polish People's Party politicians
1968 births
Living people
Members of the Polish Sejm 2005–2007
Members of the Polish Sejm 2007–2011
Members of the Polish Sejm 2011–2015
Members of the Polish Sejm 2015–2019
Members of the Polish Sejm 2019–2023